Montoya is a Basque surname. It originally comes from a hamlet near Berantevilla in Álava, in the Basque region of northern Spain. During the Reconquista, it extended southwards throughout Castille and Andalusia. The name roughly translates to mean hills and valleys. It has become more frequent among Gitanos than among the general Spanish population.

People with the surname Montoya include:
Adam Montoya (born 1984), American video game commentator, better known as SeaNanners
Al Montoya (born 1985), American ice hockey goaltender in the National Hockey League
 Aldo Montoya, a former ring persona of American professional wrestler Peter Polaco (born 1973), better known as Justin Credible
Carlos Montoya (1903–1993), Spanish flamenco guitarist and son of Ramón Montoya
Craig Montoya (born 1970), American rock musician
David Montoya (born 1978), Colombian footballer
Diego León Montoya Sánchez (born 1958 or 1961), Colombian cocaine trafficker on the FBI Ten Most Wanted Fugitives list
Eliud Montoya, American whistleblower and murder victim
Gabriel Montoya,(1868–1914), French chansonnier
Gustavo Montoya (1905–2003), Mexican painter
Jennifer Montoya (born 1985), Colombian journalist and news presenter
José Montoya (1932–2013), Chicano bilingual poet
Joseph Montoya (1915–78), U.S. Senator from New Mexico
Juan Pablo Montoya (born 1975), Colombian motor racing IndyCar driver and former NASCAR and Formula One driver
Julián Montoya (born 1993), hooker for the Argentina national rugby union team
María Laura de Jesús Montoya Upegui (1874–1949), Colombian saint (Roman Catholic)
Martha Montoya, Colombian American cartoonist and businesswoman
Martín Montoya (born 1991), Spanish association football player
Matilde Montoya (1859–1939), presumably the first female physician in Mexico to hold an academic degree
Pilar Montoya (1960–2015), Spanish flamenco dancer
Ramón Montoya (1880–1949), Spanish flamenco guitarist and father of Carlos Montoya
Ramón Montoya (baseball), Mexican baseball player (see Mexican Professional Baseball Hall of Fame) 
Richelle Montoya, American politician 
Rose Montoya, American model, internet celebrity, and transgender activist
Rubén Montoya (born 1940), Argentine footballer 
Sergio Luis Henao Montoya, or Sergio Henao (born 1987), Colombian bicycle road racer
Las Hermanas Montoya, Latin singing group, active 1948–1969
Martina Vigil-Montoya (1856–1916), Native American ceramics painter from San Ildefonso Pueblo, New Mexico
Nestór Montoya, (1862-1923), United States Representative from New Mexico

Fictional characters
Carmelita Montoya Fox, a female INTERPOL officer from the Sly Cooper series of video games
Fritz Montoya, in the Honorverse book series
Inigo Montoya, a fencer from William Goldman’s novel The Princess Bride and the movie from the novel
Domingo Montoya, father of Inigo Montoya from The Princess Bride
Nemi Montoya, Norwegian comic book character
Renee Montoya, police detective in DC Comics' Gotham City Police Department
Josefina Montoya, an American Girl character residing in Santa Fe in 1824
 Gabriel Montoya, one of the Spanish assassins from the 2015 film Bill

References

Basque-language surnames